Andrés Molteni and Diego Schwartzman were the defending champions but only Molteni chose to defend his title, partnering Sergio Galdós. Molteni lost in the first round to Pedro Cachín and Nicolás Jarry.

Romain Arneodo and Fernando Romboli won the title after defeating Ariel Behar and Fabiano de Paula 2–6, 6–4, [10–8] in the final.

Seeds

Draw

References
 Main Draw

Uruguay Open - Doubles
2017 Doubles